Joseph Wade Scott (December 2, 1924 – March 6, 1979) was an American R&B trumpeter, bandleader, songwriter, arranger, record producer and A&R man, best known for his work at Duke and Peacock Records in the 1950s and 1960s, notably with Bobby "Blue" Bland.

Biography
Born in Texarkana, Texas, United States, he settled in Houston, Texas, by about 1950, becoming established as the principal bandleader, A&R man and arranger at Don Robey's Duke and Peacock Records.  He wrote and arranged songs for Johnny Ace, Big Mama Thornton, Bobby Bland, and Junior Parker, as well as leading their touring bands.  Among the songs that Scott wrote – although in most cases Robey claimed a co-writing credit with him, or in some cases sole credit – were Bobby Bland's "Lead Me On", "Turn On Your Love Light" and "Ain't Nothing You Can Do"; Larry Davis' "Texas Flood"; Johnny Ace's "Never Let Me Go"; and Junior Parker's "Annie Get Your Yo-Yo".

Scott's arrangements featured extensive use of brass instruments, and "typified the Duke sound".  According to Melvin Jackson, who also played in Bland's band, "Joe Scott was the man who created the big horn sound for blues bands."

He and his wife moved to California in 1970s.  Scott died in Culver City, California, in the 1979, aged 54.

References

1924 births
1979 deaths
People from Texarkana, Arkansas
African-American record producers
Record producers from Arkansas
American music arrangers
20th-century African-American people